One Good Night Deserves Another is the third studio album by American country music artist Steve Wariner. It was released in 1985 by MCA Records. The album produced three singles, "What I Didn't Do", "Heart Trouble", and "Some Fools Never Learn", which respectively reached #3, #8, and #1 on the Billboard Hot Country Singles chart. "Some Fools Never Learn" was number one for one week and spent a total of twenty-two weeks on the chart.

Track listing

Personnel
Jerry Douglas - dobro (3)
Vince Gill - background vocals (4,6,10)
Johnny Gimble - fiddle (1,5)
Emory Gordy Jr. - bass guitar (all tracks)
Roger Hawkins - drums (all tracks)
Carl Jackson - banjo (8), background vocals (8)
John Barlow Jarvis - keyboards (all tracks)
Mac McAnally - background vocals (2,5,7)
Wendy Waldman - background vocals (1,2,5,6,9,10)
Billy Joe Walker Jr. - acoustic guitar (except 8), classical guitar (9) electric guitar (6,8,10), electric guitar solo (6)
Steve Wariner - lead vocals (all tracks), background vocals (7), electric guitar (1,3,7), electric guitar solo (1,4,5,7)
Terry Wariner - background vocals (3)
Reggie Young - electric guitar (all tracks)

Chart performance

Weekly charts

Year-end charts

=

References

Steve Wariner albums
1985 albums
Albums produced by Tony Brown (record producer)
MCA Records albums